Jurong Regional Library (Chinese: 裕廊区域图书馆; Malay: Perpustakaan Wilayah Jurong) is a public library located in Jurong East, Singapore. It is located next to JCube and is within walking distances of Jurong East Bus Interchange and Jurong East MRT station. It is the third regional library to be completed after the Tampines and Woodlands regional libraries and is currently the largest public library under the National Library Board network of public libraries.

During the construction of the National Library building, it temporarily housed the main collections of the reference library until the opening of the new building on 22 July 2005.

History
The library was first opened on 1 August 1988 as Jurong East Community Library by Ho Kah Leong who was the Senior Parliamentary Secretary (Communications & Information) and Member of Parliament for Jurong Constituency. It was subsequently closed in June 2003 for upgrading works. After the completion of its refurbishment in 2004, it was re-opened as Jurong Regional Library on 4 June that year by the then Acting Minister for Education, Tharman Shanmugaratnam.

Notes

External links
Jurong Regional Library

2004 establishments in Singapore
Libraries established in 2004
Library buildings completed in 2004
Libraries in Singapore
Jurong East